Numbami (also known as Siboma or Sipoma) is an Austronesian language spoken by about 200 people with ties to a single village in Morobe Province, Papua New Guinea. It is spoken in Siboma village, Paiawa ward, Morobe Rural LLG.

Numbami is a phonologically conservative isolate within the Huon Gulf languages, and is the last Austronesian language on the south coast of the Huon Gulf. Its nearest relatives along the coast to the southeast are 270 km away, Maisin and Arifama-Miniafia in Oro Province (Northern Province in the former colony of Papua).

The word order typology of Numbami and the Huon Gulf languages is subject–verb–object (SVO), which is typical of Austronesian languages; while that of Arifama-Miniafia and most of the Papuan Tip languages is subject–object–verb (SOV), which is typical of Papuan languages. Maisin has been characterized as a mixed language, with both Austronesian and Papuan features that obscure its primary heritage, and there is evidence that settlements of Austronesian speakers along the 270 km of coast were gradually absorbed into inland communities speaking Binanderean languages (Bradshaw 2017).

Phonology
Numbami distinguishes 5 vowels and 18 consonants. Voiceless /s/ is a fricative, but its voiced and prenasalized equivalents are affricated, varying between more alveolar  and more palatalized . The liquid /l/ is usually rendered as a flap . The labial approximant is slightly fricative, tending toward , when followed by front vowels.

Vowels (orthographic)

Consonants (orthographic)

Obstruent harmony
Prenasalized obstruents only occur in medial position, where the distinction between oral and prenasalized voiced obstruents is somewhat predictable. Medial voiced obstruents are statistically far more likely to be oral in words beginning with oral voiced obstruents, while they are far more likely to be prenasalized in words beginning with anything else. If denasalization of voiced obstruents is an ongoing change, one can track its progress through different lexical environments: it is 100% complete in word-initial position (as in  'pig' and  'areca nut'), 80% complete in the middle of words beginning with voiced obstruents (as in  'market' and  'head' vs.  'driftwood'), 35% complete in the middle of words beginning with approximants or vowels (as in  'crosswise' vs.  'handdrum' and  'canoe'), not quite 20% complete in words beginning with voiceless obstruents (as in  'left side' vs.  'butterfly' and  'flea'), not quite 5% complete in words beginning with nasals (as in  'thing' and  'to die'), and not attested at all in words beginning with liquids (as in  'nit' and  'lime spatula'). (See Bradshaw 1978a.)

Morphology
Although Numbami is phonologically conservative, it retains very little productive morphology, most of it related to person and number marking.

Pronouns and person markers

Free pronouns
Free pronouns occur in the same positions as subject or object nouns. They distinguish three persons (with a clusivity distinction in the first person) and four numbers (Bradshaw 1982a).

Genitive pronouns
Genitive pronouns also distinguish three persons (plus clusivity) and four numbers (Bradshaw 1982a).

Subject prefixes
Verbs are marked with subject prefixes that distinguish three persons (plus clusivity) and two tenses, Nonfuture and Future. (The latter distinction is often characterized as one between Realis and Irrealis mode; see Bradshaw 1993, 1999.) 

In most cases, subject prefixes are easily segmentable from verb stems, but in a few very high frequency cases, prefix-final vowels merge with verb-initial vowels to yield irregularly inflected forms, as in the following paradigm: wani (< wa-ani) '1SG-eat', woni (< u-ani) '2SG-eat', weni (< i-ani) '3SG-eat', tani (< ta-ani) '1PLINCL-eat', mani (< ma-ani) '1PLEXCL-eat', moni (< mu-ani) '2PL-eat', teni (< ti-ani) '3PL-eat'.

Numerals
Traditional Numbami counting practices started with the digits of the left hand, then continued on the right hand and then the feet, to reach '20', which translates as 'one person'. Higher numbers are multiples of 'one person'. Nowadays, most counting above '5' is done in Tok Pisin. As in other Huon Gulf languages, the short form of the numeral 'one' functions as an indefinite article.

Names
Like many other Huon Gulf languages, Numbami has a system of birth-order names. The seventh son and sixth daughter are called "No Name": Ase Mou 'name none'.

Ideophones
Although many languages have a class of ideophones with distinctive phonology, Numbami is unusual in having a morphological marker for such a class. The suffix -a(n)dala is unique to ideophones but is clearly related to the word andalowa 'path, way, road' (POc *jalan). (See Bradshaw 2006.) In the following examples, acute accents show the placement of word stress.
 bái-andala 'overcast, clouded over'
 dendende-ándala 'shivering'
 golópu-adala 'slipping or dripping through'
 kí-andala 'scorching, parched'
 paká-adala 'getting light, flashing on, popping'
 pilipíli-adala 'flapping, fluttering'
 sí-andala 'shooting up, springing away'
 sulúku-adala 'sucking, slurping'
 taká-adala 'stuck fast, planted firmly'
 tíki-adala 'going dark'

Syntax

Word order
The basic word order in Numbami is SVO, with prepositions, preposed genitives, postposed adjectives and relative clauses. Relative clauses are marked at both ends, and so are some prepositional phrases. Negatives come at the ends of the clauses they negate. There is also a class of deverbal resultatives that follow the main verb (and its object, if any).

'The two of them killed a pig.'

'My cross-cousin doesn't understand Numbami.'

'We (excl.) put the food we've pared into the pot.'

Possessive vs. attributive genitives
Two kinds of genitive modifiers precede their heads while one type follows its head noun (Bradshaw 1982a).

Whole-part genitives
Noun-noun phrases denoting wholes and parts occur in the order stated, with the latter serving as head of the phrase: wuwu lau 'betel pepper leaf', tina daba 'headwater', nima daba (lit. 'hand head') 'thumb', kapala lalo (lit. 'house inside') 'indoors', Buzina bubusu 'Buzina (Salamaua) point'.

Possessive genitives
Genitive possessor nouns precede their head nouns, with an intervening possessive marker that distinguishes singular (na) from plural (ndi) possessors: wuwu na lau 'the leaves of the (generic) betel pepper plant; particular betel pepper plant's leaf'; kapala na lalo 'the insides of (generic) houses; the inside of a particular house'; Siasi ndi gutu 'the Siassi Islands; islands belonging to a particular group of Siassi people'; bumewe ndi bani 'food typically eaten by whites; food belonging to a particular group of whites'.

Attributive genitives
Attributive genitives resemble possessive genitives except that (1) the modifiers follow their heads, and (2) the "possessors" are nonreferential except in a generic sense, that is, they "never refer to a particular subset of the set they name" (Bradshaw 1982a:128): wuwu weni na 'forest (wild) betel pepper', wuwu Buzina ndi 'type of betel pepper associated with the Buzina people at Salamaua', walabeŋa tamtamoŋa na 'fish poison, native means of stunning fish', walabeŋa bumewe na 'explosives, European means of stunning fish'.

Verb serialization
Verb serialization is very common in Numbami. Within a serial verb construction, all verbs must agree in tense. Subject choice in successive verbs is severely constrained. Noninitial subjects can only refer to preceding subjects, preceding objects, or preceding events or conditions, and only in that order (Bradshaw 1993). Negatives come at the ends of the clauses they negate.

'Okay, we come back down carrying food.'

'Don't you turn around and talk to me.'

'They'll put dry fronds on top of the sago starch.'

'And you'll set it afire.'

'I saw you first.'

'Nowadays, we two don't see each other very regularly.'

External links
 Numbami (Siboma) Wordlist at the Austronesian Basic Vocabulary Database
 Numbami-English dictionary (PDF)
 English-Numbami dictionary (PDF)
 Recorded and written materials for Numbami are archived with Kaipuleohone

References

 Bradshaw, Joel (2017). Evidence of contact between Binanderean and Oceanic languages. Oceanic Linguistics 56:395–414.
 Bradshaw, Joel (2010). Manner and path verb serialization in Numbami. In A journey through Austronesian and Papuan linguistic and cultural space: Papers in honour of Andrew Pawley, ed. by John Bowden, Nikolaus P Himmelmann, and Malcolm Ross, pp. 441–453. Pacific Linguistics 615. Canberra: Pacific Linguistics.
 Bradshaw, Joel (2006). Grammatically marked ideophones in Numbami and Jabêm. Oceanic Linguistics 45:53–63.
 Bradshaw, Joel (1999). Null subjects, switch-reference, and serialization in Jabêm and Numbami. Oceanic Linguistics 38:270–296.
 Bradshaw, Joel (1997). The population kaleidoscope: Another factor in the Melanesian diversity v. Polynesian homogeneity debate. Journal of the Polynesian Society 106:222–249.
 Bradshaw, Joel (1993). Subject relationships within serial verb constructions in Numbami and Jabêm. Oceanic Linguistics 32:133–161.
 Bradshaw, Joel (1982a). Genitives and relatives in Numbami, a New Guinea Austronesian language. In Gava‘: Studies in Austronesian languages and cultures dedicated to Hans Kähler, ed. by Rainer Carle, Martina Heinschke, Peter W. Pink, Christel Rost, and Karen Stadtlander, pp. 123–139. Veröffentlichungen des Seminars für Indonesische und Südseesprachen der Universität Hamburg, vol. 17. Berlin: Dietrich Reimer.
 Bradshaw, Joel (1982b). Word order change in Papua New Guinea Austronesian languages. Ph.D. dissertation, University of Hawaii.
 Bradshaw, Joel (1978a). The development of an extra series of obstruents in Numbami. Oceanic Linguistics 17:39–76.
 Bradshaw, Joel (1978b). Multilingualism and language mixture among the Numbami. Kivung: Journal of the Linguistic Society of Papua New Guinea 11:26-49.
 Ross, Malcolm (1988). Proto Oceanic and the Austronesian languages of western Melanesia. Canberra: Pacific Linguistics.

North New Guinea languages
Languages of Morobe Province
Subject–verb–object languages
Mixed languages
Vulnerable languages